José Luis Real Casillas (born 6 June 1952) is a Mexican former professional footballer and sports development & youth academy director for Liga MX club Toluca.

Career
Born in Guadalajara, Jalisco, Real played club football for C.D. Guadalajara and Atlas.

Real managed Chivas, leading the club to a runners-up finish in the 2010 Copa Libertadores.

On 29 May 2013, he was announced as Chivas USA's new head coach.  

On 25 November 2013, he was announced to return to Club Guadalajara as head coach. After the season, he was let go.

The club offered him a new job but this time as the Director of Sports Development in Guadalajara's youth academy but he was once again let go in June 2014.

In October 2014, newly appointed Guadalajara president Néstor de la Torre hired Real as the new Technical-Tactical Coordinator for the youth academy. This is Real's third stint as a director in the club's youth academy.

In February 2019, Real was appointed as interim manager of Toluca after the destitution of Hernán Cristante.

References

External links
 

1952 births
Living people
Mexican footballers
Mexican football managers
C.D. Guadalajara footballers
Atlas F.C. footballers
Atlas F.C. managers
C.D. Guadalajara managers
Liga MX players
Chivas USA coaches
Expatriate soccer managers in the United States
Major League Soccer coaches
Association football midfielders